

Hartman is surname of German origin. Notable people with the surname include:

A 
Angélica María Hartman (born 1944), American-born Mexican actress and singer
Anton Hartman (1918–1982), South African conductor and music educator
Arne Hartman (born 1940), Finnish diplomat
Arthur A. Hartman (1926–2015), American diplomat, ambassador to France and the Soviet Union
Arthur Hartman (1881–1956), American violinist and composer
Ashley Hartman (born 1985), American actress and fashion model

B 
Barend Hartman van Groningen (c. 1740 – 1806), Dutch Mennonite teacher and minister
Billy Hartman (born 1957), Scottish actor
Blanche Hartman (1926–2016), American Soto Zen teacher
Bob Hartman (born 1949), American artist, singer/songwriter, & religious leader
Brynn Hartman (1958–1998), American model & actress
Butch Hartman (born 1965), American animator

C 
C. Bertram Hartman (1882–1960), American landscape painter
Carl Johan Hartman (1790–1849), Swedish physician and botanist
Carl Hartman (botanist) (1824–1885), Swedish botanist, son of Carl Johan
Carl Vilhelm Hartman (1862–1941), Swedish botanist and anthropologist, son of Carl (1824–1885)
Charles S. Hartman (1861–1929), U.S. Representative from Montana

D 
Dan Hartman (1950–1994), American singer/songwriter
David Hartman (1931–2013), American rabbi
David Hartman (born 1935), American journalist, actor and media host
Don Hartman (1900–1958), American screenwriter and director
Donald Adam Hartman (1929–1996), Mayor of Calgary (1989)
Donniel Hartman, Israeli rabbi and philosopher

E 
Edward Hartman (1964–2003), American convicted murderer
Elizabeth Hartman (1943–1987), American actress
Ellen Hartman (1860–1945), Swedish actress

G 
Gabrissa Hartman, Nauruan politician
Geoffrey Hartman (1929–2016), German-born American deconstructionist literary critic
Grace Hartman (1900–1998), first female mayor of Sudbury, Ontario
Grace Hartman (1907–1955), American dancer and actress, wife of Paul Hartman
Grace Hartman (1918–1993), Canadian labour union activist
Greg Kroah-Hartman, computer scientist

J 
Jack Hartman (1925–1998), American basketball coach
 (1851–1924), Dutch Latin philologist
Jan Hartman (1887–1969), Dutch fascist and Nazi collaborator during World War II
Jan Hartman (born 1967), Polish philosopher and bioethicist
Jesse Lee Hartman (1853–1930), U.S. Representative from Pennsylvania
Johnny Hartman (1923–1983), American jazz singer

K 
Kenneth E. Hartman (born 1960), American writer, prison activist and convicted murderer
Kevin Hartman (born 1974), American soccer player
Kim Hartman (born 1955), English actress

L 
Lisa Hartman (born 1956), American actress and singer
Louis O. Hartman (1876–1955), American Methodist minister

M 
Marie Louise Hartman (born 1959), known professionally as Nina Hartley, American pornographic film actress and sex educator
Mauno Hartman (1930–2017), Finnish sculptor
Milka Hartman (1902–1997), Austrian-Slovenian poet
Mike Hartman (born 1967), American ice hockey player

O 
Olov Hartman (1906–1982), Swedish writer

P 
Paul Hartman (1904–1973), American dancer and actor, husband of Grace Hartman
Paul Leon Hartman (1913–2005), American experimental physicist
Peter G. Hartman (born 1947), English-German biochemist
Peter Hartman (born 1949), Dutch executive, president of KLM from 2007 to 2013
Phil Hartman (1948–1998), Canadian-born American actor, comedian, screenwriter, and graphic artist
Philip Hartman (1915–2015), American mathematician, known a.o. for the Hartman–Grobman theorem
Piet Hartman (1922–2021), Dutch crystallographer
Piret Hartman (born 1981), Estonian politician

Q 
Quilindschy Hartman (born 2001), Dutch footballer

R 
Robert S. Hartman (1910–1973), German-born American logician and philosopher, né Robert Schirokauer
Rosella Hartman (1895–1984), American painter, etcher and lithographer
Ryan Hartman (born 1994), American ice hockey player
Ryan Hartman (baseball) (born 1994), American baseball player

S 
Saidiya Hartman (born 1961), American writer and academic
Sam Hartman (born 1999), American football player
Sid Hartman (1920–2020), American sports journalist
Steve Hartman (sportscaster) (born 1958), American sportscaster
Steve Hartman (born 1963), American broadcast journalist

T 
Tim Hartman (born 1965), American Filipino martial artist
Tova Hartman (born 1957), Israeli gender studies scholar, daughter of David Hartman (rabbi)

V 
Victor Hartman (1839–1898), Swedish actor

W 
Wiesław Hartman (1950–2021), Polish equestrian
Wink Hartman, American businessman

Fictional characters
Dr. Elmer Hartman, Family Guy character named after Elmer "Butch" Hartman 
Erik Hartman, fictitious Belgian reality show presenter 
Mary Hartman, eponymous character of the satirical soap opera Mary Hartman, Mary Hartman
 Gunnery Sergeant Hartman, a character in the 1987 film Full Metal Jacket

Given and middle names
Hartman Bache (1798–1872), American lighthouse engineer
Hartman H. Lomawaima (1949–2008), Native American director of the Arizona State Museum
Hartman Longley (born 1952), Chief Justice of The Commonwealth of The Bahamas
Hartman Louis Oberlander (1864–1922), American baseball pitcher
Hartman Rector Jr. (1924–2018), American Latter Day Saints leader
Hartman Toromba (born 1984), Namibian football defender
Hartman Turnbow (1905–1988), American Civil Rights activist
Daniël Hartman Craven (1910–1993), South African rugby player, coach and administrator
William Hartman Woodin (1868–1934), American industrialist

See also
Hartmann
Hardman
The Hartmans, American television sitcom

Dutch-language surnames
Swedish-language surnames
Jewish surnames
Patronymic surnames

de:Hartman
fi:Hartman
fr:Hartman
it:Hartman
nl:Hartman
pl:Hartman
pt:Hartman
sv:Hartman